Ain't That Ducky is a 1945 Warner Bros. Looney Tunes cartoon, directed by Friz Freleng. The cartoon was released on May 19, 1945, and stars Daffy Duck.

In the short, Daffy has to outwit a hunter after him — and find out what is in the briefcase another duck is carrying around. While Mel Blanc did the voices for the ducks in this cartoon, the hunter was voiced by Victor Moore, a departure from either Blanc or Arthur Q. Bryan. This is the first Looney Tunes cartoon to use a shortened opening cue of The Merry-Go-Round Broke Down.

Plot
Daffy is taking a bubble bath in a pond when he hears the sobbing of a yellow duckling carrying a satchel. When Daffy politely asks the duckling what is wrong with him, the rude yellow duckling stops sobbing long enough to emit a loud "AAH, SHUT UP!" before opening the satchel and resuming his devastation. When Daffy tries to find out what is in the satchel that is causing the yellow duckling so much grief, the duckling tells Daffy, "AAH, KEEP YOUR HANDS OFF, MISTOR ANTHONY!" (a reference to the host of the radio advice series The Goodwill Hour; see the ending of Baby Bottleneck). Even the presence of a hunter does not stop the yellow duckling from stopping Daffy with a loud, "AAH, LAY OFF, YOU... DUCK!"

The hunter (a caricature of Victor Moore, voiced by the actor, as well) then asks the yellow duckling if he can help, only to get shot down with exactly the same obnoxious, "AAH, SHUT UP!" that Daffy was shot down with. When Daffy confronts the hunter, the hunter turns his attention to going after Daffy instead. The next few minutes follow a typical "Hunter/Prey" cartoon, with some exceptions - when Daffy comes across an empty space, he tells the artist that there is supposed to be a barrel in the scene - "It says so in my script! Someone's been laying down on the job. J.L. will hear of this!" (a hand then draws a barrel for Daffy to hide in, but with the yellow duckling inside).

About two-thirds of the way through, Daffy and the hunter team up to try to get the satchel, but are stopped when they run down the road. The hunter then tries chasing Daffy, but runs over a cardboard stand-up of Daffy, thinking it is the real thing. When the yellow duckling ruins Daffy's fun at the expense of the hunter, Daffy decides enough is enough and tries grabbing the satchel. However, he is knocked down the side of the mountain, 'melting' down the rocks. When the hunter is also knocked down, he reveals that he was able to swipe the satchel. The two take a look inside, and soon are just as distressed as the yellow duckling was — the content is a piece of paper with the words "The End" on it, displayed as the cartoon ends.

See also
 List of cartoons featuring Daffy Duck

References

External links
 Ain't That Ducky at IMDb

1945 animated films
1945 short films
1945 films
Looney Tunes shorts
Warner Bros. Cartoons animated short films
Short films directed by Friz Freleng
Films scored by Carl Stalling
Daffy Duck films
Films about hunters
1940s Warner Bros. animated short films
Films with screenplays by Michael Maltese
1940s English-language films